Semicassis inornata is a species of large sea snail, a marine gastropod mollusc in the family Cassidae, the helmet snails and bonnet snails.

Description

Distribution
This marine species occurs off Japan.

References

 Goodwin (2008). Bull. Inst. Malac. Tokyo 3 (9) : 143-144

External links
 Pilsbry, H. A. (1895). Catalogue of the marine shells of Japan with descriptions of new species and notes on others collected by Frederick Stearns. F. Stearns, Detroit, viii + 196 pp, 11 pls

External links

Cassidae
Gastropods described in 1895
Taxa named by Henry Augustus Pilsbry